In the Australian Football League (AFL), the "Colliwobbles" refers to the period between Collingwood's 1958 and 1990 premierships, where the  Magpies reached nine AFL/VFL Grand Finals for eight losses and a draw in 1977. 

This era was dubbed as the Colliwobbles partly because Collingwood sometimes lost by small margins; in this way, "Colliwobbles" is a specific term for choking when it is done by Collingwood.

The term was coined by Lou Richards, and is a play on the words "Collingwood" and "collywobbles" (a state of intestinal disorder, usually accompanied by a rumbling stomach). 

The main period of the Colliwobbles ended in the 1990 AFL Grand Final, when Collingwood defeated  to win their first premiership since 1958. Lou Richards ceremoniously announced the end of the Colliwobbles, and the club marked the occasion with the burial of a memoir of the hitherto trying times in front of a large crowd at Victoria Park. 

After losing the 2018 grand final after leading most of the day, there was talk in the media that the Colliwobbles have returned. 

1958 is Collingwood's last September premiership as of 2018; the 1990 and 2010 premierships were won in October due to drawn finals (both involving Collingwood), which are no longer possible, and Collingwood have won only two (and drawn two) of the sixteen Grand Finals they have appeared in since their 1958 premiership.

Grand Final appearances during the main "Colliwobbles" period

Grand Final appearances since the main "Colliwobbles" period

Trivia and statistics since 1958
The highest Collingwood attendance was 121,696 in 1970 against  (which also remains a league record). The lowest was 79,451 in 2003 against Brisbane due to renovation works at the MCG.
Collingwood's highest score was 19.10 (124) in the 1977 replay against . Its lowest was 2.2 (14) against  in 1960.
The lowest score conceded by Collingwood was 5.11 (41) in 1990 against Essendon. The highest score conceded was 23.21 (159) in 1980 against Richmond.

See also
Sports-related curses
Kennett curse
Essendon Football Club supplements saga

References

Australian Football League
Australian rules football terminology
Collingwood Football Club
Australian folklore
Australian rules football culture